Łoje may refer to the following places:
Łoje, Kozienice County in Masovian Voivodeship (east-central Poland)
Łoje, Przasnysz County in Masovian Voivodeship (east-central Poland)
Łoje, Ełk County in Warmian-Masurian Voivodeship (north Poland)
Łoje, Gołdap County in Warmian-Masurian Voivodeship (north Poland)

See also
 Łoje-Awissa
 Łojew 
 Łojewo (disambiguation)